The Holovkinskoho waterfall is located on the Uzen'-Bash river in the Crimean Mountains, Crimea.

See also
 Waterfalls of Ukraine

References

External links
 

Waterfalls of Crimea